is a passenger railway station located in the city of Higashimatsuyama, Saitama, Japan, operated by the private railway operator Tōbu Railway.

Lines
All services, (TJ Liner, Rapid express, Express, Semi express, Local) stop at this station. During the daytime, the station is served by eight trains per hour in each direction.

Station layout
The station consists of two side platforms serving two tracks, with the station building located above the platforms.

Platforms

History

The station was renamed Higashi-Matsuyama Station in October 1954 when Higashi-Matsuyama became a city. The station building was refurbished between 2008 and 2010 with the addition of lifts on either side.

From 17 March 2012, station numbering was introduced on the Tōbu Tōjō Line, with Higashi-Matsuyama Station becoming "TJ-29".

Passenger statistics
In fiscal 2019, the station was used by an average of 28,778 passengers daily. Passenger figures for previous years (boarding passengers only) are as shown below.

Surrounding area
 Saitama Children's Zoo
 Saitama Prefectural Higashimatsuyama Girls' High School

See also
 List of railway stations in Japan

References

External links

 Tobu station information 

Railway stations in Saitama Prefecture
Stations of Tobu Railway
Tobu Tojo Main Line
Railway stations in Japan opened in 1923
Higashimatsuyama, Saitama